The 1974 UCLA Bruins football team represented the University of California, Los Angeles during the 1974 NCAA Division I football season.  the Pacific-8 Conference, the Bruins were led by first-year head coach Dick Vermeil and played their home games at the

Schedule

Roster

Honors
All conference first team: Norm Anderson (SE), Gene Clark (OT), Fulton Kuykendall (LB)

References

UCLA Bruins football
UCLA Bruins football seasons
UCLA Bruins football
UCLA Bruins football